The rivière Wessonneau du Milieu (English: Wessonneau of the Middle River) is a tributary of the Wessonneau North River, in the town of La Tuque, in the region of Mauricie, in the province of Quebec, in Canada.

Since the middle of the 19th century, forestry has been the main economic activity in this sector. In the 20th century, recreational and tourist activities have been highlighted, because the territory has been integrated into the zec Wessonneau. Some forest roads serve this valley for forestry and recreational tourism purposes.

The water surface is normally frozen from the beginning of December to the end of March; however, safe traffic on the ice is usually from mid-December to the middle of March.

Geography 
The Wessonneau du Milieu river is located to the west of the Saint-Maurice River, to the south of the rivière aux Rats and to the northwest of the Wessonneau River. The neighboring watersheds of the Wessonneau du Milieu River are:
 to the north: the Wessonneau North river
 in the south: Dickie stream and the Livernois River.

In its course, the Wessonneau du Milieu crosses several lakes, in particular: Montreal, Nelson, Thomas (neighbor of Lac Sauvageau), Lac Geoffrion, a small unnamed lake, Lac Ann, and Charlemagne.

Course from head (segment of )

From its mouth, the river flows over:
  towards the northeast, where it collects a small stream; and
  east to flow into Lake Montreal (along  oriented to the southeast; altitude of ) that the current passes through.

 a bay in the northwest the waters of five lakes including Lake Oblong;
 the south side: the outlet of Lac du Sable;
 the south-eastern side: the discharge of three unnamed lakes; and four lakes including Lake Dempsey.

Course downstream from Lake Geoffrion

The Wessonneau du Milieu river continues its course eastward on:
  towards the south-east, up to the outlet of Lac des Fourches;
  east, to a small stream, coming from the north;
  towards the south-east, up to the outlet of three lakes including Merède lake;
  towards the south-east, to the outlet (coming from the south of Gros Élan lake which drains the water (on the south side ) the outlet of three lakes including Lac Baril, the outlet of two small lakes on the south side The mouth of Lac du Gros Élan is located at the eastern end;
  towards the south-east, until the outlet of a small unnamed lake, coming from the north;

Course downstream from Lake Charlemagne (segment of )

The river continues to descend on:
  towards the south-east, in a strait which constitutes a widening of the river;
  east, to a stream coming from the north;
  south to the outlet of Dickie Creek;
  southeasterly, to the outlet of the southern Wessonneau river;
  eastward; then the river branches off to the northeast;
  north-east, to a small stream coming from the west;
  northeasterly, up to Campbell Creek;
  eastward to its mouth which empties into the Wessonneau North River.

Toponymy 
The toponyms Lake Wessonneau, Rivière Wessonneau, Zec Wessonneau, Rivière Wessonneau du Milieu, River Wessonneau North and River Wessonneau South are interrelated, having the same origin.

The toponym Rivière Wessonneau du Milieu was made official on December 5, 1968, at the Bank of place names of the Commission de toponymie du Québec.

See also 

 List of rivers of Quebec

References 

Rivers of Mauricie
Geography of La Tuque, Quebec